Clapp is an English surname, most commonly found in the West Country and in the United States.
The word signifies rough ground, or a small hill.

Some men who brought the surname "Clapp" to America include:

Captain Roger Clapp, who came to the New World on the ship Mary and John, which landed at Nantasket (now Hull, Massachusetts), on May 30, 1630.  He helped establish the town of Dorchester, Massachusetts, soon afterward.  He worked for many years in important positions for the town and in the military organization, including a long period as commandant of Castle Island.

Deacon Edward Clapp, an older brother of Roger, arrived in Dorchester, Massachusetts, in 1633.  It has mistakenly been reported that he had no children, but his last will and testament prove otherwise. Edward was married to Prudence, and their son Nehemiah married Sarah Leavitt, daughter of John Leavitt, one of the first settlers of Dorchester and later of Hingham, Massachusetts. Nehemiah Clapp lived in Hingham for a few years, but relocated to Dorchester, where he died at age 38 in 1684.

Thomas Clapp, a cousin of Roger and Edward, arrived in the same ship as Edward in 1633.  He later moved to Weymouth, and then to Scituate, Massachusetts, where he was a Deputy of the Court.

Deacon Nicholas Clapp, brother of Thomas, arrived in Dorchester, Massachusetts, in 1633.  He was an upstanding member of his community, occasionally mediating disputes.

George Gilson Clapp came to America in 1666, residing for a time in South Carolina before settling in Westchester County, New York.

People with the surname

Allen Clapp (born 1967), American singer, guitarist and principal songwriter of the rock band The Orange Peels
Almon M. Clapp (1811–1899), American politician and first Public Printer of the United States 
Asa Clapp (merchant) (1762–1848), American merchant and politician
Asa Clapp (politician) (1805–1891), American politician, son of the above
Austin Clapp (1910–1971), American swimmer and water polo player
Benjamin Clapp (born 1977), American musician
Benjamin L. Clapp (1814–1865), Mormon leader and member of the First Seven Presidents of the Seventy
Cameron Clapp (born 1986), American disabled athlete and actor
Cornelia Clapp (1849–1934), American zoologist
Dominic Clapp (born 1980), English cricketer
George Hubbard Clapp (1858–1949), American pioneer in the aluminum industry
Gordon Clapp (born 1948), American actor
Harold Winthrop Clapp (1875–1952), Australian transport administrator
Harvey Clapp (1817–1889), American farmer and politician
James Kilton Clapp (1897–1965), American electrical engineer and inventor
John Clapp (artist), professor and children's book illustrator
John Clapp (baseball) (1851–1904), Major League Baseball player and manager
Joseph Dorr Clapp (1811–1900), American businessman and politician
Krissada Sukosol Clapp (born 1970), Thai singer and actor
Louise Clapp (1934–1967), All-American Girls Professional Baseball League player
Louise Brough Clapp (1923–2014), American tennis player
Margaret Clapp (1910–1974), American scholar, educator and Pulitzer Prize winner
Mark R. Clapp (1803–1891), American politician and farmer
Michael Clapp (born 1932), retired Royal Navy commodore, Amphibious Force commander in the Falklands War
Moses E. Clapp (1851–1929), American lawyer and politician
Nicholas Clapp (born 1936), American writer and filmmaker
Philip Greeley Clapp (1888–1954), American educator, conductor, pianist and composer of classical music
Priscilla A. Clapp (born 1941), American diplomat
Richard Stubby Clapp (born 1973), Canadian baseball player
Robert Edwin Clapp (1855–after 1908), Canadian physician and politician
Susannah Clapp (born 1949), British theatre critic, writer and book editor
Thomas Clap or Clapp (1703–1767), American academic and educator, President of Yale College
Tom Clapp (1858–1933), English rugby union player
Verner Clapp (1901–1972), American librarian and writer
Will Clapp (born 1995), American football player
Philip John Clapp, aka Johnny Knoxville (born 1971), American actor

See also
Louise Amelia Knapp Smith Clappe, a.k.a. "Dame Shirley", an American writer (d. 1906)
William Clapp House, in Dorchester, Massachusetts, built in 1806
Captain Lemuel Clap House, also in Dorchester, MA, built in 1767
Clapp oscillator, an oscillator invented in 1948 by James K. Clapp
Clap (disambiguation)
Klapp

References